is a Japanese footballer who had playes as a forward for K3 League side Gyeongju KHNP.

Club career

Albirex Niigata Singapore
Nishiguchi played for Albirex Niigata Singapore FC in the 2020 Singapore Premier League and started the season perfectly by scoring in 5 straight games. He eventually finished the season with 5 goals and notched 1 assist in 11 league appearances as he helped the White Swans to the 2020 Singapore Premier League title.

Tanjong Pagar United 
On 14 Dec 2020, the Jaguars announced the capture of the Japanese forward for the 2021 Singapore Premier League season. Reo started all 21 games for the Jaguars in the 2021 season and amassed a return of nine goals and four assists in the season. Reo bettered his form in the 2022 season, scoring 30 goals in 30 games as he finished third in the goalscorers' chart.

Career statistics

Club

Notes

References

1997 births
Living people
Association football people from Osaka Prefecture
Chukyo University alumni
Japanese footballers
Association football forwards
Singapore Premier League players
Cerezo Osaka players
Albirex Niigata Singapore FC players
Tanjong Pagar United FC players
Japanese expatriate footballers
Japanese expatriate sportspeople in Singapore
Expatriate footballers in Singapore